The Austro-Hungarian Fourth Army was an Austro-Hungarian field army that fought during World War I.

Actions 
The Austro-Hungarian Fourth Army was formed in August 1914 and deployed on the Russian Front. It remained active there until it was disbanded in March 1918.

It participated in the: 
 Battle of Komarów (August 1914)
 Battle of Rawa (September 1914) 
 Battle of the Vistula River (October 1914)
 Battle of Limanowa (December 1914)
 Gorlice–Tarnów Offensive (May-June 1915)
 Great Retreat (June-September 1915)
 Brusilov Offensive (June-September 1916)
 Operation Faustschlag (February-March 1918)

Commanders
 Moritz von Auffenberg : August 1914 - 30 September 14 
 Archduke  Joseph Ferdinand : 30 September 1914 - June 1916 
 Karl Tersztyánszky von Nádas : June 1916 - 5 March 1917 
 Karl Graf von Kirchbach auf Lauterbach : 5 March 1917 – 15 March 1918

External links 
 Austro-Hungarian Army, Higher Commands and Commanders 

Field armies of Austria-Hungary
1914 establishments in Austria-Hungary
1918 establishments in Austria-Hungary
Military units and formations established in 1914
Military units and formations disestablished in 1918